Saint-Martin-de-Vers (Languedocien: Sent Martin de Vèrn) is a former commune in the Lot department in south-western France. On 1 January 2016, it was merged into the new commune of Les Pechs-du-Vers. Its population was 108 in 2019.

See also
Communes of the Lot department

References

Saintmartindevers